Nuri al-Badran (born 1943) was the Minister of Interior in the cabinet appointed by the Interim Iraq Governing Council in September 2003. A secular Shiite Muslim, Badran served in the government of Saddam Hussein as ambassador to the Soviet Union until fleeing Iraq upon its 1990 invasion of Kuwait. In exile, he joined the Iraqi National Accord opposition group (led by his brother-in-law Ayad Allawi). Badran resigned his post in April 2004 amid a corruption scandal.

References
 

Interior ministers of Iraq
1943 births
Living people
Iraqi Shia Muslims
Ambassadors of Iraq to the Soviet Union
Iraqi National Accord politicians